24 stundir (24 hours) was the third-largest daily newspaper in Iceland, first published in May 2005. The paper was originally named Blaðið (The Paper), but this was changed in October 2007. Between August and October 2007, its ratings were 42.1%, just behind the Morgunblaðið, which had 43.1%.

As a result of the Icelandic financial crisis, 24 stundir ceased publication on 10 October 2008, resulting in 20 jobs being cut.

List of editors 
The newspaper was founded by Karli Garðarsson, Sigurður G. Guðjónsson, and Steini Kára Ragnarsson.

 Karl Garðarsson, was the first editor of the paper, from its first publication on 5 May 2005.
 Ásgeir Sverrisson, from 1 February 2006.
 Sigurjón M. Egilsson, from 8 July 2006.
 Trausti Hafliðason, from December 2006.
 Ólafur Þ. Stephensen, from 1 June 2007 
 Gunnhildur Arna Gunnarsdóttir, from 20 May 2008

References

External links
 
 Timarit page

2005 establishments in Iceland
2008 disestablishments in Iceland
Defunct newspapers published in Iceland
Defunct free daily newspapers
Newspapers established in 2005
Publications disestablished in 2008
Daily newspapers published in Iceland